E-squared may refer to:
 "E²", an episode of Star Trek: Enterprise
 E-Squared Records, a music label founded by Steve Earle and Jack Emerson